Behind the Walls is a 2018 sculpture by Spanish artist Jaume Plensa.

Description
The sculpture is 7.467 meters or 24.5 feet tall, and depicts the head of a teenage girl who has her hands covering her eyes. It is made of polyester resin and marble dust.

History
Behind the Walls debuted in May 2019 at the Frieze Sculpture festival in Manhattan, and it was on view at Rockefeller Center. From October 2019 to February 2020, it was installed outside the Museo Nacional de Arte in Mexico City.

Behind the Walls is currently outside the University of Michigan Museum of Art in Ann Arbor. The museum acquired it through a gift from J. Ira and Nicki Harris. The sculpture was installed in front of the museum in November 2020, taking the place of Mark di Suvero's piece Shang.

References

Sculptures by Jaume Plensa
Tourist attractions in Ann Arbor, Michigan
Outdoor sculptures in Michigan
2018 sculptures
2020 establishments in Michigan
Public art in Michigan
Resin sculptures
Marble sculptures in Michigan
University of Michigan campus
Culture of Ann Arbor, Michigan
Contemporary works of art
Colossal statues in the United States